X Force was the name given to the portion of the National Revolutionary Army's Chinese Expeditionary Force that retreated from Burma into India in 1942. Chiang Kai-shek sent troops into Burma from Yunnan in 1942 to assist the British in holding back the Japanese. These Chinese forces became broken up, and in the retreat out of Burma part of these forces entered India. These were  cantoned at Ramgarh Cantonment in the Bihar Province (now in Jharkhand State), brought up to five-Division strength (Chinese New 30th,  New 22nd, New 38th, 14th and 50th Divisions), and re-equipped and re-trained by American instructors at British expense. 

Each of the five divisions had about 15,000 troops, for a total of 75,000 for the whole force. The New 30th and New 38th Divisions formed the New 1st Army which was commanded by Sun Li-Jen. The New 22nd, 14th and 50th Divisions formed the New 6th Army which was commanded by Liao Yaoxiang. They were named X Force and used by General Joseph Stilwell as the spearhead of his drive to open a land route to China (the Ledo Road). The outstanding Chinese commander in X Force was General Sun Li-Jen, who led the Chinese 38th Division and was praised by the British Fourteenth Army Commander General (later Field Marshal) William Slim in his book Defeat into Victory. The Chinese forces which re-entered Burma from Yunnan were correspondingly known as Y Force.

China Defensive 1942-1945 

China Defensive 1942-1945 was an essay prepared for the United States Army Center of Military History by Mark D. Sherry.

See also
 India-China Division
 China Burma India Theater
 Northern Combat Area Command
 New 1st Army
 Burma Road
 V Force
 Z Force (Burma)
 Chinese Expeditionary Force (Burma)

Notes

References

External links 
 

Units and formations of the National Revolutionary Army
Second Sino-Japanese War

Military units and formations of the Republic of China in World War II
South-East Asian theatre of World War II
C